Jake McIntyre (born 24 April 1994) is an Australian rugby union player. He currently plays as a fly-half Perpignan in France Top 14. McIntyre was previously with Clermont in France as well as Queensland Reds and Western Force in the Super Rugby competition and Brisbane City in Australia's National Rugby Championship.

Early life and career
Jake McIntyre was born in Alstonville in northern New South Wales. He was selected for the Australian Schoolboys rugby team in 2011 and 2012. McIntyre joined Queensland club side Sunnybank and his performances in the Queensland Premier Rugby competition led to his selection in the Australia Under-20 team to play at the 2013 World Rugby Under 20 Championship in France and the 2014 World Rugby Under 20 Championship in New Zealand.

Rugby career
McIntyre was the starting fly-half for the Brisbane City team which won the inaugural season of the National Rugby Championship (NRC) in 2014. He signed an Elite Development Squad contract with the Queensland Reds for 2015, but sat out the early part of the season after off-season knee surgery.

He made his Super Rugby debut against the Melbourne Rebels as the starting fly-half for the Reds on 15 May 2015, scoring a try in a dominant win at Suncorp Stadium. He went on to gain two further Super Rugby caps in his first season.

After two seasons with Agen as their leading point scorer, McIntyre joined French giant ASM Clermont Auvergne on a two year deal. In their season opener and his debut, Jake scored 8 points and had two try assists in Clermont's 28-10 win over La Rochelle.

On 6 November 2020, McIntyre left Clermont to return to Australia with Western Force in the upcoming Super Rugby seasons on a two-year deal.

References

External links
 It's Rugby stats

1994 births
Living people
Australian rugby union players
Rugby union fly-halves
Brisbane City (rugby union) players
Queensland Reds players
SU Agen Lot-et-Garonne players
ASM Clermont Auvergne players
Western Force players
Rugby union players from New South Wales
USA Perpignan players